Carole Landis (born Frances Lillian Mary Ridste; January 1, 1919 – July 5, 1948) was an American actress and singer. She worked as a contract player for Twentieth Century-Fox in the 1940s. Her breakout role was as the female lead in the 1940 film One Million B.C. from United Artists. She was known as "The Ping Girl" and "The Chest" because of her curvy figure.

Early life
Landis was born on January 1, 1919, in Fairchild, Wisconsin, the youngest of five children of Clara (née Sentek), a Polish farmer's daughter, and Norwegian-American Alfred Ridste, a drifting railroad mechanic who abandoned the family after Landis's birth. According to Landis's biographer E. J. Fleming, circumstantial evidence supports that Landis was likely the biological child of her mother's second husband, Charles Fenner. Fenner left Landis's mother in April 1921 and remarried a few months later.

In 1923, Landis's family moved to San Bernardino, California, where her mother worked menial jobs to support the family. At the age of 15, Landis dropped out of San Bernardino High School and set forth on a career path to show business. She started out as a hula dancer in a San Francisco nightclub, where she was described by her boss as a "nervous $35-a-week blonde doing a pathetic hula at her opening night at the old Royal Hawaiian on Bush [Street]...that'll never get her anyplace in show business". He apparently employed her only because he felt sorry for her; she later sang with a dance band. She bleached her hair blonde and changed her name to "Carole Landis" after her favorite actress, Carole Lombard. After saving $100, she moved to Hollywood.

Career

Film career
Landis made her film debut as an extra in the 1937 film A Star Is Born; she also appeared in various horse operas. She posed for hundreds of cheesecake photographs. She continued appearing in bit parts until 1940, when Hal Roach cast her as a cave girl in One Million B.C.. The movie was a sensation and turned Landis into a star. A press agent nicknamed her "The Ping Girl" (an awkward contraction of "purring").

Landis appeared in a string of successful films in the early 1940s, usually as the second female lead. In a time when the singing of many actresses was dubbed in, Landis's own voice was considered good enough and was used in her few musical roles. Landis landed a contract with Twentieth Century-Fox and began a sexual relationship with Darryl F. Zanuck. She had roles playing opposite fellow pin-up girl Betty Grable in the musical Moon Over Miami and crime drama I Wake Up Screaming, both in 1941. When Landis ended her relationship with Zanuck, her career suffered and she was assigned roles in B-movies.

Her final two films, Noose and Brass Monkey, were both made in Great Britain.

USO Tours
In 1942, she toured with comedienne Martha Raye, dancer Mitzi Mayfair and actress Kay Francis with a USO troupe in England and North Africa. Two years later, she entertained soldiers in the South Pacific with Jack Benny. Benny later said that while many entertainers were reluctant to visit wounded men in camp hospitals, Landis made a point of spending time with them, and she displayed tremendous empathy as she talked with them about their lives and families back home. Landis traveled more than 100,000 miles during the war and spent more time visiting troops than any other actress. She became a popular pin-up with servicemen during World War II.

Broadway
In 1945 she starred on Broadway in the musical A Lady Says Yes, with future novelist Jacqueline Susann in a small role. Susann is said to have based the character of Jennifer North, from her best-selling novel Valley of the Dolls, in part on Landis.

Writing
Landis wrote several newspaper and magazine articles about her experiences during the war, including the 1944 book Four Jills in a Jeep, which was later made into a movie costarring Kay Francis, Martha Raye, and Mitzi Mayfair. She also wrote the foreword to Victor Herman's cartoon book Winnie the WAC.

Personal life

Landis was married four times and had no children (she was unable to conceive owing to endometriosis). In January 1934, 15-year-old Landis married her first husband, 19-year-old Irving Wheeler. Her mother had the marriage annulled in February 1934. Landis persuaded her father, Alfred Ridste (who had left the family shortly after Landis was born and who, by coincidence, lived near the family in San Bernardino), to allow her to remarry Wheeler. He finally relented, and the two were remarried on August 25, 1934. After three weeks of marriage, Landis and Wheeler got into an argument and Landis walked out. Neither filed for divorce, and Landis began pursuing an acting career. In 1938, Wheeler reappeared and filed a $250,000 alienation of affections lawsuit against director and choreographer Busby Berkeley. Even though Landis and Wheeler were estranged, he claimed that Berkeley had enticed and otherwise persuaded Landis to transfer her affections. Landis maintained that she had not seen Wheeler in years and heard from him only the previous year when he claimed to want a divorce. Wheeler's lawsuit was later dismissed, and Landis and Wheeler were divorced in 1939. In June 1939 Berkeley proposed to Landis but later broke it off. On July 4, 1940, she married yacht broker Willis Hunt, Jr. in Las Vegas. Landis left Hunt after two months of marriage; they were divorced in November 1940.

While touring army camps in London in 1942, she met United States Army Air Forces Captain Thomas Wallace. They were married in January 1943 but separated in May 1945. They divorced in July 1945.

On December 8, 1945, Landis married Broadway producer W. Horace Schmidlapp. They separated in 1947 and Landis filed for divorce in May 1948, charging Schmidlapp with "extreme mental cruelty".
During her separation from Schmidlapp, Landis began a relationship with actor Rex Harrison, who was then married to actress Lilli Palmer. The affair became an open secret in Hollywood. After Landis's death, however, Harrison downplayed their relationship and publicly claimed that she was merely a close friend of himself and Palmer.

Death

Landis was reportedly crushed when Harrison refused to divorce his wife for her; unable to cope any longer, she committed suicide in her Pacific Palisades home at 1465 Capri Drive by taking an overdose of Seconal. Harrison was the last person to see her alive, having had dinner with her the night before she committed suicide.

The next afternoon, Harrison and Landis's maid discovered her on the bathroom floor. Harrison waited several hours before he called a doctor and the police. According to some sources, Landis left two suicide notes, one for her mother and the second for Harrison, who instructed his lawyers to destroy it. During a coroner's inquest, Harrison denied knowing any motive for her suicide and told the coroner he did not know of the existence of a second suicide note. Landis's official website, which is owned by her family, has questioned the events of Landis's death and the coroner's ruling of suicide.
She is interred in Forest Lawn Memorial Park Cemetery in Glendale, California, in plot 814 of the "Everlasting Love" section. Among the celebrities at her funeral were Cesar Romero, Van Johnson, and Pat O'Brien. Harrison attended with his wife.

Landis has a star on the Hollywood Walk of Fame at 1765 Vine Street.

Filmography

Radio appearances

References

Further reading

External links

 
 

1919 births
1948 suicides
20th-century American actresses
20th Century Studios contract players
Actresses from Wisconsin
American film actresses
American people of Norwegian descent
American people of Polish descent
American stage actresses
Burials at Forest Lawn Memorial Park (Glendale)
Drug-related suicides in California
Barbiturates-related deaths
People from Fairchild, Wisconsin
Female suicides
1948 deaths